The discography of American musical group Kid Creole and the Coconuts created and led by August Darnell includes fourteen studio albums, one live album, seven compilations, one extended play and twenty-seven singles. The small discography of The Coconuts – Kid Creole's backing singers – consisting of two studio albums and three singles is included on this page.

Studio albums

Live albums
 Oh! What a Night (Prism Platinum, 2000)

Compilation albums
 Cre~Olé: The Best of Kid Creole & the Coconuts (ZE, Island, 1984) UK #21 (Re-released in 1993 with a bonus track)
 Kid Creole Redux (Sire, London, Rhino, 1992)
 Haiti (Viceroy Music Europe, 1996) (Compilation of tracks from 1995's To Travel Sideways and Kiss Me Before the Light Changes)
 Classic Kid Creole & The Coconuts - The Universal Masters Collection (Island, 1999)
 Wonderful Thing (Spectrum Records, 2000)
 The Ultimate Collection (CCM, 2003)
 Going Places: The August Darnell Years 1976-1983 (Strut Records, 2008) (Compilation of August Darnell's work with Kid Creole and the Coconuts, Dr. Buzzard's Original Savannah Band and production work)
 Kid Creole & The Coconuts: Anthology Vols. 1 & 2 (Rainman Records/RED 2009) <small> (Compilation of remixed and/or re-imagined Kid Creole and Dr. Buzzard's Original Savannah Band selections)

Extended plays
 Christmas in B'Dilly Bay with Kid Creole and the Coconuts (Island, 1982)

Singles

Notes

A"He's Not Such a Bad Guy (After All)", "There But For the Grace of God Go I" and "Maladie D'Amour" charted together as a triple-sided single on the Billboard Hot Dance Club Play chart.
B"Que pasa" / "Me No Pop I" is credited as 'Kid Creole and the Coconuts presents Coati Mundi'. It was originally released in 1980 on Antilles Records before being re-released on ZE/Island and charting in the summer of 1981.
C"Going Places (Zemix)" charted as a triple-sided single on the Billboard Hot Dance Club Play chart together with "In the Jungle" and "Table Manners".
D"Don't Take My Coconuts was originally released in 1983, on the Coconuts album "Don't Take My Coconuts", before being released as a single in 1984, to promote the compilation Cre~Olé - The Best of Kid Creole and the Coconuts.
E"I'm a Wonderful Thing, Baby", "I'm Corrupt" and "Annie, I'm Not Your Daddy" charted together on the Billboard Hot Dance Club Play chart.
F"Dear Addy" is sometimes credited as the lead song on the EP Christmas in B'Dilly Bay with Kid Creole and the Coconuts.

The Coconuts
Kid Creole wrote and produced an album for his backing singers 'The Coconuts' in 1983. The three-piece consisted of Adriana Kaegi, Cheryl Poirier and Taryn Hagey. A second album was released in Japan in 1991.

 Studio albums
 Don't Take My Coconuts (EMI America, 1983)
 Killer Bees (Creole/Nippon Columbia, 1991)

Singles
 "Did You Have to Love Me Like You Did" b/w "Hats Off to Citizen K" (1983) UK #60
 "Ticket to the Tropics" b/w "Kriminal-Tango" (1983)
 "If I Only Had a Brain" b/w "Indiscreet" (1983) US #108

August Darnell as producer
 Studio albums
 Dr. Buzzard's Original Savannah Band – Meets King Pennett (RCA, 1978) (associate producer)
 Aural Exciters - Spooks in Space (ZE, 1979)
 Gichy Dan's Beachwood # 9 - Gichy Dan's Beachwood # 9 (RCA, 1979)
 Machine - Machine (RCA, 1979)
 Cristina - Cristina (aka Doll in the Box) (ZE, 1980)
 Funkapolitan - Funkapolitan (London, 1982)
 The Coconuts - Don't Take My Coconuts (EMI America, 1983)
 Elbow Bones and the Racketeers – New York At Dawn (EMI America, 1983)

Singles
 James White and The Blacks - "Contort Yourself" (ZE, 1979)
 Cristina - "Is That All There Is?" (ZE, 1980)

References

Discographies of American artists